Transvision is an extended play by German electronic artist Alva Noto. It was released in 2005 via Raster Noton label.

Background
This is the second part of the transall triptych that, according to the artist, respectively deals with one of three interrelated themes: the increased speed of information flow, utopias, and the fragmentation of ideas. The record is accompanied by an essay written by theorist and filmmaker Kodwo Eshun who turns on ideas of freedom, intuition, and possibility in the service of erecting a monument (sic). His most attractively cogent observation states that the enigma of the sonic makes life vivid.

Track listing

Personnel
Carsten Nicolai – sounds
Kodwo Eshun – liner notes
Nibo, R-N Modul Berlin – design

References

External links
Alva Noto official website

2005 albums
Alva Noto albums
Raster-Noton albums